Andrew Rynne is a retired Irish surgeon, medical practitioner and founder of Clane General Hospital in County Kildare. Rynne was the chairperson of the Irish Family Planning Association and the Republic of Ireland's first vasectomy specialist. He was known for his liberal approach to birth control.

Early life and education 
Rynne was born on 18 May 1942 in Downings House in  Prosperous, County Kildare. His father was Stephen Rynne, a writer, broadcaster, author and wit, while his mother, Alice Curtayne, was a writer, hagiographer, lecturer, linguist and scholar. He attended National School Prosperous from 1947 to 1951 and Ring College Waterford from 1951 do 1952. From 1961 to 1968, he attended Royal College of Surgeons in Ireland. After graduation, Rynne emigrated to Canada with an internship with Hamilton Civic Hospital.

Career
He started his general practise in Mitchell, Ontario from 1968 to 1973, where he was introduced to vasectomy. In 1970, he was appointed as the coroner for the Perth County, Ontario. In January 1974, he returned to Ireland and established a general practise in Clane, County Kildare.

In 1975, Rynne joined Irish Family Planning Association (IFPA) and started doing vasectomies for them. In 1984, he sold condoms as an act of civil disobedience and got fined £500. In the following year, he became the Chairman of IFPA. In the same year, he founded Clane General Hospital with the opposition from the Catholic Church and the local supporters.

Shooting
In 1990, Rynne was shot by a former client. According to Rynne, the gunman fired six or seven times with a .22 Long Rifle and shot him in the right hip. The incident is the subject of a short film The Vasectomy Doctor by Paul Webster.

Bibliography
 Smoking is Your Decision. Ward River Press 1982
 Abortion. The Irish Question. Ward River Press 1983
 The Vasectomy Doctor. Mercier Press 2005

Trivia
The house featured on the front cover of Prosperous, a music album by Irish folk musician Christy Moore, was owned by Andrew Rynne.

In March 2021, Rynne attended a protest against the lockdown in Dublin. After protests turned violent, he claimed that some protesters, who provoked the police, could have been planted by the government.

See also
 Vasectomy

References

External links
 

Living people
1942 births
Irish surgeons